City of Fear (German: Scharfe Küsse für Mike Forster) is a 1965 spy thriller film directed by Peter Bezencenet and starring Paul Maxwell, Terry Moore and Marisa Mell. It was co-production between the United Kingdom and West Germany. Location shooting took place in Austria where the film is partly set.

Cast
 Paul Maxwell as Mike Foster
 Terry Moore as Suzan
 Marisa Mell as 	Ilona
 Albert Lieven as 	Dr. Paul Kovac
 Pinkas Braun as 	Ferenc
 Helga Lehner as Eva
 Zsuzsa Bánki as 	Magda
 Brigitte Heiberg as 	Zsu Zsu
 Maria Rohm as Maid
 Mária Takács as 	Marika

References

Bibliography
 Mann, Dave. Harry Alan Towers: The Transnational Career of a Cinematic Contrarian. McFarland, 2014.

External links
 

1965 films
1960s spy thriller films
West German films
1960s English-language films
British spy thriller films
German spy thriller films
Films shot in Vienna
Films set in Vienna
Films set in Budapest
Allied Artists films
Films directed by Peter Bezencenet
1960s British films
1960s German films